Colin David Currie (born 25 September 1976) is a Scottish virtuoso percussionist. He is the founder and leader of the Colin Currie Group, an ensemble dedicated to performing and recording the music of Steve Reich.

Biography

Early years
Colin Currie began his musical studies at the age of 5. He attended the Junior Department of the Royal Scottish Academy of Music and Drama from 1990 to 1994, where he studied percussion with Pamella Dow and piano with Sheila Desson, both of whom had an enormous influence on him. He then went on to graduate from the Royal Academy of Music in 1998, and played principal timpani and percussion with the National Youth Orchestra of Scotland and The European Union Youth Orchestra. However, solo-performance and chamber music had by that time become his main focus.

Currie first came to national attention when he won the Gold Medal of the Shell/LSO Competition in 1992, and was subsequently the first percussionist to reach the finals of the BBC Young Musician of the Year competition in 1994. Currie is considered as one of the most charismatic young artists in the world of contemporary music and seen as a catalyst for the creation of new music. He won the Royal Philharmonic Society Young Artist Award in 2000, was a BBC Radio 3 New Generation Artist between 2003 and 2005 and received a Bortletti Buitoni Trust Award in 2005.

Career
Colin Currie performs regularly with many orchestras and conductors around the world. Well known for championing new music, Currie has premiered works by composers such as Elliott Carter, Louis Andriessen, Einojuhani Rautavaara, Jennifer Higdon, Kalevi Aho, Rolf Wallin, Kurt Schwertsik, Simon Holt, Alexander Goehr, Dave Maric, Julia Wolfe and Nico Muhly. Currie leads percussion ensemble The Colin Currie Group which performs the music of Steve Reich. He has made a number of recordings of contemporary percussion concerti and recorded a solo album, Borrowed Time''', on the Onyx label. His recording of Jennifer Higdon's Percussion Concerto won the 2010 Grammy Award for Best Classical Contemporary Composition.

In May 2015, Colin Currie was awarded the Royal Philharmonic Society Instrumentalist Award for achievement in the UK during 2014.

Colin Currie is Visiting Professor of Solo-Percussion in the Royal Academy of Music in London and the Royal Conservatoire in The Hague and is involved in educational and outreach work with a variety of age-groups.
In January 2011 Currie was appointed as an Artist in Residence at London's Southbank Centre and still holds the position. In recent seasons, Currie has been a central figure in festivals hosted by the Southbank Centre. In autumn 2013 as part of the festival The Rest is Noise, Currie and members of the Colin Currie Group performed works by Stockhausen and Steve Reich, which Guy Dammann of The Guardian praised for being "technically impeccable and musically overwhelming". In 2014, The Southbank Centre presented Metal Wood Skin, a percussion festival dedicated to Currie. The festival included a number of new commissions, including the world premiere of Reich's Quartet for two vibraphones and two pianos and the UK premiere of Louis Andriessen’s Percussion Concerto'', Tapdance, alongside new works by James MacMillan and Anna Clyne. De Doelen in Rotterdam have appointed Currie as their Red Sofa Artist, a role that involves collaboration with Rotterdam Philharmonic Orchestra and other artists. During this time, Currie is set to debut more compositions, including new works by Dave Maric and Reich.

Personal life
Currie enjoys theater and biking in his spare time.

References

External links
 
Interview on The Next Track podcast

1976 births
Living people
Scottish percussionists
Alumni of the Royal Academy of Music
Alumni of the Royal Conservatoire of Scotland
Place of birth missing (living people)
EMI Classics and Virgin Classics artists
BBC Radio 3 New Generation Artists